Damocloids are a class of minor planets such as 5335 Damocles and 1996 PW that have Halley-type or long-period highly eccentric orbits typical of periodic comets such as Halley's Comet, but without showing a cometary coma or tail. David Jewitt defines a damocloid as an object with a Jupiter Tisserand invariant (TJ) of 2 or less, while Akimasa Nakamura defines this group with the following orbital elements:
 q < 5.2 AU, a > 8.0 AU, and e > 0.75,
 or alternatively, i > 90°

Using the Tisserand's parameter with respect to Jupiter of 2 or less, there are currently 220 damocloid candidates . Of these objects, 189 have orbital observation arcs greater than 30 days providing reasonably decent orbits. Their average radius is eight kilometers assuming an albedo of 0.04. The albedos of four damocloids have been measured, and they are among the darkest objects known in the Solar System. Damocloids are reddish in color, but not as red as many Kuiper-belt objects or centaurs.

Origin 
Damocloids are thought to be nuclei of Halley-type comets that have lost all their volatile materials due to outgassing and become dormant. Such comets probably originate from the Oort cloud. This hypothesis is strengthened by the fact that a number of objects thought to be damocloids (and assigned minor-planet provisional designations) subsequently showed a coma and were confirmed to be comets: C/2001 OG108 (LONEOS),  (LINEAR),  (LINEAR),  (Spacewatch) and possibly others. Another strong indication of cometary origin is the fact that some damocloids have retrograde orbits, unlike any other minor planets. (Objects with an inclination beyond 90 degrees up to 180 degrees are in a retrograde orbit and orbit in the opposite direction of other objects.)

List 

 this list from the JPL SBDB contains 20 numbered and 268 unnumbered bodies that meet Akimasa Nakamura's criteria for being classified as a damocloid, that is, either a retrograde orbit, or the following orbital elements: q < 5.2 AU, a > 8.0 AU, and e > 0.75 (also see ). Tisserand's parameter with respect to Jupiter (TJupiter) is also given. Akimasa Nakamura's criteria and a TJupiter of less than 2 are largely equivalent as only a few listed bodies do not meet the defined TJupiter threshold. Most damocloids are also listed on MPC's list of other unusual minor planets. The orbital data is sourced from JPL-numbered and -unnumbered element files. The list includes A/-designated objects (introduced in 2017) that were mistakenly identified as a comet, but are actually minor planets. However it excludes hyperbolic bodies such as A/2019 G4 as well as ʻOumuamua and 2I/Borisov, two interstellar objects.

Notes

See also 
 Extinct comet
 List of centaurs (small Solar System bodies)

References

External links 
 A first look at the Damocloids, David Jewitt, January 2005
 Damocloid family, David J. Darling

 
Distant minor planet groups and families